George Arbuthnot, DD ( 24 May 1846 – 9 November 1922) was Archdeacon of Coventry from 1908 until his death.

Arbuthnot was born in Loanhead and educated at Eton College and Christ Church, Oxford. He was ordained in 1872, and was curate at St Nicholas, Arundel until 1873, when he became its vicar.   In 1879 he became the incumbent at Stratford upon Avon.

References

1846 births
1922 deaths
People from Loanhead
People educated at Eton College
19th-century English Anglican priests
20th-century English Anglican priests
Alumni of Christ Church, Oxford
Archdeacons of Coventry
George